The Blue and Gray Museum in Fitzgerald, Georgia is located in a historic railroad depot that has been renovated to showcase the story of Fitzgerald's history and connections with the American Civil War. At the museum's core is its Hall of Honor, dedicated to the Civil War veterans who established the city.  The museum also honors the town's local heroes, including General Raymond Gilbert Davis, the nation's most highly decorated Marine.

See also
Blue and Gray Museum (disambiguation)

References

External links
 Blue and Gray Museum - City of Fitzgerald

Museums in Ben Hill County, Georgia
American Civil War museums in Georgia (U.S. state)